Merlin was designed by Bill Lee.  Merlin is considered to an Ultra Light Displacement (ULDB).  The racing yacht has won numerous offshore yacht races including the Transpac (Transpacific Yacht Race) in 1977 establishing a course record that stood for 20 years.  She is a 68 foot long by 12 foot wide monohull weighing in at 25,000 pounds. Merlin is currently owned and raced by William F. "Chip" Merlin, founder of Merlin Law Group, for his team Merlin Yacht Racing.

Biography 
Named after a combination of the Arthurian legend, the P-51 aircraft engine and a small falcon hawk, Merlin surprised even those who expected her to be fast. In July 2016, Sailing Magazine declared Merlin, "the most noteworthy racing boat of the last 50 years".

History 

Bill Lee is well-known in the yacht racing circuit as one of its most integral figureheads. Dubbed “The Wizard,” Lee first achieved recognition in the 1970s with his boats Chutzpah and Merlin, both of which having won the Transpacific Yacht Race from Los Angeles to Honolulu on multiple occasions. Merlin’s record-setting Transpacific Yacht Race voyage was completed in 8 days, 11 hours, and 1 minute. The record stood from 1977-1997.

Design 

Lee’s design came from his obsession with crafting a narrow and light boat that could essentially surf on the water—Merlin can be likened to a sled, of sorts. With this in mind, Lee got to work designing boats that were half the size of the competition. What these boats lacked in size, they made up for in speed. The slogan, “Fast is Fun!” became Lee’s mantra and embraced his mindset in forging a new class of racing vessel.

Notoriety 

Part of the reason why Merlin is lauded amongst the racing community is that it is heralded as the first of its kind. Lee’s innovative, yet at the time controversial, design reshaped the schematics applied to racing vessels. Lee’s background was certainly not given proper attention, as he held a mechanical engineering degree and worked in the defense industry performing stress and weight analysis tests on amphibious crafts and submarines prior to his yacht racing endeavors.

This defiance for the racing design norms of the time coupled with the Cinderella story of Merlin being reunited with Lee later in life make for quite the narrative. Aside from that, Merlin’s success over the years speaks for itself. In fact, Merlin still competes at a high level to this day.

Latest Tenure with Chip Merlin 

William F. “Chip” Merlin was looking to purchase a racing yacht to take his father Bill Merlin, former U.S. Coast Guard admiral and competitor in the 1954 and 1956 Bermuda races, in order to sail the storied race together. Merlin happened to come across an advertisement for the famous yacht and contacted Bill Lee that same night. The next day, Merlin’s boat captain Brian Malone flew out to meet Lee and inspect the vessel. Having the same last name as the esteemed yacht was purely coincidental, but more than enough of a sign to push Merlin to pull the trigger on acquiring it.

Merlin won three separate regattas in 2018. It also set another course record in the 50th running from St. Petersburg, FL, to Isla Mujeras. Under Merlin’s ownership, the yacht continued to make waves and eventually landed on the December 2018 cover of Sail Magazine.

A boat with this long of a lifespan has undergone multiple renovations and Merlin is making some of his own, including a retrofit adding modern carbon fiber and updated rigging. His goal is to make this the fastest version of Merlin to exist. Best of all, Bill Lee is still involved in the process and collaborating on these renovations.

Course Records 

 July 1977: Transpacific Yacht Race from Los Angeles to Honolulu – Merlin set a record by finishing in 8 days, 11 hours, and 1 minute, beating Windward Passage’s 1971 record by over 22 hours. Merlin held this record for 20 years.  Merlin held this record for 20 years.
 February 1978: San Diego to Manzanillo, Mexico – Merlin won the 1,110-mile race, finishing first in the big boat class and fifth overall on corrected time.
 July 1978: Victoria, BC to Maui, Hawaii – Merlin set a new record finishing 2 days and 17 hours ahead of the previous record held by Grand Illusion.
 July 1980: Pacific Cup – San Francisco to Hawaii, finished first overall with a time of 10 days, 4 hours, 51 minutes, and 52 seconds.
 September 1983: Windjammer from San Francisco to Santa Cruz
 July 1987: Transpac from Los Angeles to Honolulu – Merlin was first to finish and became the third boat in Transpac history to score three elapsed time victories. The crew was awarded the Steve Newmark Seamanship Trophy.
 July 1995: Transpac from Los Angeles to Honolulu – First corrected overall yacht. Won the King Kalakaua Trophy.
 July 2017: Transpac from Los Angeles to Honolulu – Merlin, reacquired by Bill Lee, finished in 8 days, 2 hours, 34 minutes, and 9 seconds. Although this did not set any records, it did beat her 1977 time of 8 days, 11 hours, 1 minute, and 45 seconds.
 St. Petersburg, FL to Habana, Cuba (February 2018): First to Finish.
 June 2018: Newport to Bermuda – Merlin finished with the fastest time at 16 hours, 11 minutes, and 52 seconds.
 Regatta del Sol, St. Petersburg, FL to Isla Mujeres, Mexico (April 2019): First to Finish in 1 day, 24 hours and 24 minutes, setting course record at the 50th Anniversary of this Regatta.

Transpac’s The Merlin Trophy 
In 2009, Trisha Steele, a fourth-generation Transpac racer and herself a former owner of Merlin, dedicated a new trophy, The Merlin Trophy, for the fastest elapsed time for the unlimited class of yachts competing in the Transpac Race. The trophy was built by Ken Gardiner and is a scale model of Merlin itself. The Merlin Trophy is for RSS 51 and 52 waiver yachts (exempt from the Racing Rules of Sailing limitations on moveable ballast and/or stored power) up to 100 feet with the shortest elapsed time.

Ownership 

 First: Bill Lee 1977–1983
 Second: Don Campion 1983–2000
 Third: Al Micalief 2000-2002 (Briefly changed name to Merlin’s Reata)
 Fourth: Orange Coast College School of Sailing and Seamanship 2002–2004
 Fifth: Trisha Steele 2004—2007
 Sixth: Bill Lee or Donn Campion 2007—2008
 Seventh: Jere Sullivan 2008-2015 
 Eighth: Bill and Lu Lee 2015–2017
 Ninth: William F. “Chip” Merlin 2017—Present

References 

Individual yachts